Polkovnik is a military rank used mostly in Slavic-speaking countries which corresponds to a colonel in English-speaking states and oberst in several German-speaking and Scandinavian countries. The term originates from an ancient Slavic word for a group of soldiers and folk. However, in Cossack Hetmanate and Sloboda Ukraine, polkovnyk was an administrative rank similar to a governor. Usually this word is translated as colonel, however the transliteration is also in common usage, for the sake of the historical and social context. Polkovnik began as a commander of a distinct group of troops (polk), arranged for battle.

The exact name of this rank maintains a variety of spellings in different languages, but all descend from the Old Slavonic word polk (literally: regiment sized unit), and include the following in alphabetical order:

 Belarus — 
 Bosnia and Herzegovina, Croatia, Montenegro and Serbia — 
 Bulgaria, North Macedonia, Russia and Ukraine — 
 Czech Republic and Slovakia — 
 Georgia — 
 Latvia — 
 Lithuania — 
 Poland — 
 Slovenia — 

Although Georgia, Latvia, and Lithuania are not Slavic countries linguistically, they have been influenced by Russian terminology due to having been part of both the Russian Empire and the Soviet Union. Latvian and Lithuanian were also influenced by Polish terminology, due to those countries having been part of the Polish-Lithuanian Commonwealth. The rank of polkovnik was also used in the Estonian army until 1924.

Countries

Russia 

In the 17th century, polkovnik became the position of a regimental commander of the streltsy; this position also made it into New Regiments of the streltsy and later into the new army of Peter the Great. The rank was legalized by Table of Ranks that placed it in the 6th grade as the second-top field officer, right under the brigadier. A promotion to the rank of polkovnik gave a privilege of hereditary nobility.

The Red Army reintroduced the polkovnik rank in 1935, together with a number of other former Russian ranks, and it continued to be in used in many ex-USSR countries, including Russia.

Rank insignia 
The Rank insignia to Polkovnik (OF-5) is as follows:

See also 
 Ranks and insignia of the Russian armed forces until 1917
 Ranks and insignia of the Red Army 1935–1940, and ... 1940–1943
 Ranks and insignia of the Soviet Army 1943–1955, and ... 1955–1991
 Ranks and insignia of the Russian Federation's armed forces 1994–2010

Poland

As part of the Commonwealth 
The rank was first introduced in the armies of the Commonwealth in the 17th century to denote a captain (rotmistrz) of the core banner of a regiment. By the end of the 17th century, the title of the assignment became a de facto rank as such and started to denote the commanding officer of the entire regiment. In mercenary troops fighting in the ranks of the Polish–Lithuanian Commonwealth's army, the direct equivalent of the rank of pułkownik was oberszter, but in the 18th century the rank was abolished and renamed as pułkownik as well.

Interwar 
During the Sanation in the period between World War I and World War II, a large number of officers were promoted to the rank, often for political reasons (the rule of the Sanation was even dubbed the government of the colonels because of that).

World War II 
During the Invasion of Poland in 1939, the Polish divisions were commanded by officers of many grades, from colonels to three-star generals. In fact 22 divisions out of 42 were commanded by colonels in 1939. The pułkownicy (plural of pułkownik) also commanded units of all sizes, from divisions down to mere battalions.

Ukraine 

In the Zaporozhian Host, the political, social, and military organization of Ukrainian cossacks, the title polkovnyk indicated a high military rank among the Ukrainian Cossack starshyna (officers); a polkovnyk commanded one or more military detachments during land and naval military actions in the 16th to 18th centuries. In the 18th century, a polkovnyk was a leader of a palanka, a territorial unit of the Zaporozhian Host. The military council elected a palanka polkovnyk to serve for a term of one year. He represented the Kosh Otaman in the palanka and had significant powers, including the right to condemn Cossacks to the death penalty. At the time of liquidation of the Zaporozhian Host by the Russian government in 1775, there were eight palanka polkovnyks. As symbol of office a polkovnyk wore a pernach (a mace with a hexagonal head; see also bulawa) in his belt.

In the Registered Cossack Army of the Polish–Lithuanian Commonwealth in the 16th and 17th centuries, a polkovnyk  commanded a regiment (. polk), a Cossack military unit. After the reform of the Cossack army by hetman Mykhailo Doroshenko in the 1620s there were six Cossack regiments, each comprising one thousand Cossacks. Polkovnyks were elected by the Cossack Council (rada) subject to the approval of the Polish government. A polkovnyk obtained a salary for his service, and enjoyed considerable privileges. After the Sejm of the Polish–Lithuanian Commonwealth adopted the "Ordination" of 1638, only noblemen (szlachta) were allowed to become polkovnyks.

During Khmelnytsky Uprising (1648-1657) and in the Cossack Hetmanate (1649-1764; also in the Slobozhanschtschyna in 1652–1765), a polkovnyk headed a territorial administrative unit, the regiment. In terms of Nobility, Khmelnytsky's Polkovnyks were recognized as equal to Lithuania's Barons. 

In modern Ukraine, the military rank of polkovnyk resembles the similar rank of the former Soviet Army.

Colonel (Eastern Europe)'s insignia

See also 
 Lieutenant (Eastern Europe)
 Lieutenant colonel (Eastern Europe)
 Lieutenant colonel general
 Comparative army officer ranks of Europe

Notes and references 

 Гайдай Л. Історія України в особах, термінах, назвах і поняттях.-Луцьк: Вежа, 2000. 
 Довідник з історії України.За ред. І.Підкови та Р.Шуста.- К.: Генеза, 1993. 
 ЗАКОН УКРАЇНИ Про військовий обов'язок і військову службу 
 Про положення про проходження військової служби відповідними категоріями військовослужбовців 
 История Советского флота 
 Воинские звания военнослужащих России и СССР 
 Воинские звания 
 Звания воинские 
 The International Encyclopedia of Uniform and Rank Insignia around the World 

Military ranks
Military ranks of Poland
Military ranks of Russia
Military ranks of Ukraine
Military ranks of the Soviet Union